James Bertolino (born 1942) is an American poet.

Biography 
Bertolino was born in Pence, Wisconsin, near the border with Michigan.  A descendant of Italian and French Canadian immigrant grandparents, he was introduced to poetry in high school by his sister, who brought him books by Allen Ginsberg, Jack Kerouac and other Beat poets from the local library; he started writing his own poems shortly thereafter. He attended University of Wisconsin in the 1960s, and later did graduate studies at Cornell University under A. R. Ammons. He taught creative writing for 36 years at several institutions, including Cornell, University of Cincinnati, Washington State University, Western Washington University, Skagit Valley College, Edmonds Community College and Shoreline Community College. He spent a year as Writer-in-Residence and Hallie Ford Chair of Creative Writing at Willamette University; in 2006 he retired from teaching. He lives with his partner, the poet and artist Anita K. Boyle, in Bellingham, Washington. In 2007, he was awarded a Jeanne Lohmann Poetry Prize for Washington State Poets.

Writing 

Bertolino is the author of 30 books and chapbooks of poetry and prose, beginning in 1968 with two chapbooks, Day of Change and Drool.  He was widely published from early on in his career, and over the years his work has appeared in more than 100 magazines and more than 40 anthologies.  As an editor he co-founded the literary journal Abraxas and the Cincinnati Poetry Review, as well as sitting on the editorial board of Ithaca House.  In 1972 he founded Stone Marrow Press, which published his own work as well as other poets' work.  He co-founded Egress Studio Press with Anita K. Boyle in 2002.

Bibliography

Poetry 
 Day of Change.  Milwaukee, WI: Gunrunner Press, 1968.  (Chapbook)
 Drool.  Madison, WI: Quixote Press, 1968.  (Chapbook)
 Ceremony.  Milwaukee, WI: Morgan Press, 1969.  (Chapbook)
 Mr. Nobody.  Menomonie, WI: Ox Head Press, 1969.  (Chapbook)
 Becoming Human.  Oshkosh, WI: Road Runner Press, 1970.  (Chapbook)
 Employed.  Ithaca, NY: Ithaca House, 1972.
 Edging Through.  Ithaca, NY: Stone Marrow Press, 1972.  (Chapbook)
 Soft Rock.  Tacoma, WA: Charas Press, 1973.  (Chapbook)
 Making Space For Our Living.  Port Townsend, WA: Copper Canyon Press, 1975.
 The Gestures.  Providence, RI: Bonewhistle Press, 1975.
 Terminal Placebos.  New York, NY: New Rivers Press, 1975.  (Chapbook)
 The Alleged Conception.  Hanover, NH: Granite Press, 1976.
 New & Selected Poems.  Pittsburgh, PA: Carnegie-Mellon University Press, 1978.
 Are You Tough Enough For The Eighties?.  St. Paul, MN: New Rivers Press, 1979.  (Chapbook)
 Precinct Kali & The Gertrude Spicer Story.  St. Paul, MN: New Rivers Press, 1982.
 21 Poems from First Credo.  Anacortes, WA: Stone Marrow Press, 1990.  (Chapbook)
 Like A Planet.  Guemes Island, WA: Stone Marrow Press, 1993.  (Chapbook)
 26 Poems from Snail River.  Bellingham, WA: Egress Studio Press, 2000.  (Chapbook)
 Greatest Hits, 1965–2000.  Johnstown, OH: Pudding House Publications, 2000.  (Chapbook)
 Pub Proceedings (with Anita K. Boyle).  Bellingham, WA: Egress Studio Press, 2001.  (Chapbook)
 Pocket Animals.  Bellingham, WA: Egress Studio Press, 2002.
 Bar Exams (with Anita K. Boyle).  Bellingham, WA: Egress Studio Press, 2004.  (Chapbook)
 Finding Water, Holding Stone.  Cincinnati, OH: Cherry Grove Collections, 2009.
 Every Wound Has A Rhythm.  Kingston, WA: World Enough Writers, 2012.
 Lit-Wads (with Anita K. Boyle).  Bellingham, WA: Egress Studio Press, 2013.  (Chapbook)
 Ravenous Bliss: New And Selected Love Poems.  Kingston, WA: MoonPath Press, 2014.
 Galaxy in Thrall. Seattle, WA: Goldfish Press, 2019
 Sun Rising into Storm.  Kingston, WA: MoonPath Press, 2021.

Prose 
 Goat-Footed Turtle.  Anacortes, WA: Stone Marrow Press, 1996.  (Chapbook)
 The Path Of Water (interview by Matthew Campbell Roberts).  Bellingham, WA: Stone Marrow Press, 2008.  (Chapbook)

Anthologies Edited 
 Northwest Poets.  Madison, WI: Quixote Press, 1968.
 Last Call: The Anthology of Beer, Wine & Spirits Poetry.  Tillamook, OR: World Enough Writers, 2018.

Sources 
 Roberts, Matthew Campbell.  "The Path Of Water: An Interview With James Bertolino".  Cortland, NY: The Cortland Review, Winter 2007.

References

External links 
 The Official Website of James Bertolino
 "The Path Of Water: An Interview With James Bertolino" by Matthew Campbell Roberts
 Egress Studio Press website
 Making Space For Our Living (reprinted by Contemporary American Poetry Archive)
 Precinct Kali & The Gertrude Spicer Story (reprinted by Contemporary American Poetry Archive)
 James Bertolino papers at Ohio University

Living people
1942 births
Cornell University alumni
University of Wisconsin–Madison alumni
University of Cincinnati faculty
American poets